Jin Ye (born 20 October 1999) is a Chinese sailor. She competed in the 49er FX event at the 2020 Summer Olympics.

References

External links
 

1999 births
Living people
Chinese female sailors (sport)
Olympic sailors of China
Sailors at the 2020 Summer Olympics – 49er FX
Place of birth missing (living people)